This is a discography for the English alternative rock singer Morrissey. Since the Smiths disbanded in 1987 he has released 13 studio albums, two live albums, 16 compilation albums, two extended plays (EPs), 60 singles and seven video albums on HMV, Sire Records, Parlophone, Polydor, RCA Victor, Island, Mercury, Sanctuary Records, EMI, Reprise Records, Rhino, Decca Records, Harvest Records, Capitol Music Group and BMG.

Albums

Studio albums

Live albums

Compilations
{|class="wikitable plainrowheaders"
! scope="col" rowspan="2"| Year
! scope="col" rowspan="2"| Title
! scope="col" colspan="5"| Peak chart positions
! scope="col" rowspan="2"| Certifications
|-
!style="width:3.5em;font-size:85%"| UK
!style="width:3.5em;font-size:85%"| AUS
!style="width:3.5em;font-size:85%"| CAN
!style="width:3.5em;font-size:85%"| SWE
!style="width:3.5em;font-size:85%"| US
|- align="center"
| 1990
! scope="row"| Bona Drag
Released: 15 October 1990
Labels: HMV, Sire
Formats: LP, cassette, CD
| 9
| 57
| 73
| —
| 59
| 
 UK: Silver
 US: Gold
|- align="center"
| 1995
! scope="row"| World of Morrissey
Released: 6 February 1995
Labels: Parlophone, Sire
Format: LP, CD
| 15
| —
| —
| 45
| 134
|
|- align="center"
| 1997
! scope="row"| Suedehead: The Best of Morrissey
Released: 8 September 1997
Label: EMI
Format: CD
| 25
| —
| —
| —
| —
| 
 UK: Gold
|- align="center"
|rowspan="2"| 1998
! scope="row"| Rare Tracks
Released: 1 April 1998
Label: Mercury
Format: CD
| —
| —
| —
| —
| —
|
|- align="center"
! scope="row"| My Early Burglary Years
Released: September 1998
Label: Reprise
Format: CD
| —
| —
| —
| —
| —
|
|- align="center"
|rowspan="2"| 2000
! scope="row"| The CD Singles '88–91'
Released: 19 June 2000
Label: EMI
Format: 10×CD single box set
| —
| —
| —
| —
| —
|
|- align="center"
! scope="row"| ''The CD Singles '91–95Released: 17 September 2000
Label: EMI
Format: 9×CD single box set
| —
| —
| —
| —
| —
|
|- align="center"
| 2001
! scope="row"| The Best of Morrissey
Released: 6 November 2001
Label: Rhino
Format: CD
| —
| —
| —
| —
| —
|
|- align="center"
| 2003
! scope="row"| Under the Influence
Released: 26 May 2003
Label: DMC
Format: CD, LP
| —
| —
| —
| —
| —
|
|- align="center"
| 2004
! scope="row"| Songs to Save Your Life
Released: 19 June 2004
Label: New Musical Express
Format: CD
| —
| —
| —
| —
| —
|
|- align="center"
| 2008
! scope="row"| Greatest Hits
Released: 11 February 2008
Label: Decca
Formats: CD, LP
| 5
| —
| —
| 16
| 178
| 
 UK: Gold
|- align="center"
|rowspan="2"| 2009
! scope="row"| The HMV/Parlophone Singles '88–'95
Released: 12 October 2009
Label: EMI
Formats: CD, digital download
| —
| —
| —
| —
| —
|
|- align="center"
! scope="row"| Swords
Released: 26 October 2009
Label: Polydor
Formats: CD, LP
| 55
| —
| —
| —
| —
|
|- align="center"
| 2011
! scope="row"| Very Best of Morrissey
Released: 25 April 2011
Label: Major Minor
Formats: CD, LP
| 80
| —
| —
| —
| —
|
|- align="center"
| 2014
! scope="row"| Morrissey Curates The Ramones
Released: November 28, 2014
Label: Rhino
Formats: LP
| —
| —
| —
| —
| —
|
|- align="center"
| 2018
! scope="row"| This Is Morrissey
Released: 6 July 2018
Label: Parlophone, Sire 
Formats: CD, LP
| —
| —
| —
| —
| —
|
|}A Chart position for the 2004 re-entry; the 1997 chart position was number 26.

 Unreleased albums 

Other album appearances

Extended plays

SinglesB All the songs were included on Bona Drag.C Double A-side.D "Glamorous Glue" was originally from the 1992 album Your Arsenal. It was not released as a single in 1992 (in any format, in any country), but made it to number 13 on the US Modern Rock charts as an album track that year. The UK chart position is for the 2011 UK single release, done to promote the Very Best of Morrissey compilation.E''' "That's Entertainment" was originally released as the B-side of the single "Sing Your Life" in 1991. This version uses different instrumentation but retains the original vocal (with some new vocals added) as the B-side version.

Videos

Music videos

References

Alternative rock discographies
Discographies of British artists
Discography